Admiral Ashmore may refer to:

Edward Ashmore (1919–2016), British Royal Navy admiral
Leslie Ashmore (1893–1974), British Royal Navy vice admiral
Peter Ashmore (1921–2002), British Royal Navy vice admiral